Electrotrans is a Ukrainian-German enterprise that was established in 2011 by Electron Corporation, TransTec Vetschau GmbH (Germany) and Avtotechnoproekt LLC.

History 
 November 11, 2011 - after the destruction of LBF by a Russian Igor Churkin, JV Electrontrans LLC was founded, which took over all the personnel and design potential of LBF.
 June 2013 - produced five-section low-floor tram Electron T5L64 with a track width of 1000 mm.
 July 22, 2013 - Electron T5L64 tram was transferred to Lviv utility company Lvivelectrotrans.
 September 2014 - produced three-section low-floor tram Electron T3L44 with a track width of 1000 mm.
 October 2014 - production of the low-floor trolleybus Electron T19 started.
 June 2015 - the Electrontrans joint venture won a tender for the supply of the Electron E19101 electric bus to Lviv in the amount of UAH 8.997 million.
 July 2015 - the company won a tender for the supply of seven Electron T5B64 trams with a track width of 1524 mm to Kyiv in the amount of UAH 183.75 million.
 September 2015 - the company won a tender for the production of ten buses for Lviv worth UAH 35.85 million.

Owners 
 Electron Corporation — 64%.
 TransTec F&E Vetschau UG (Germany) — 26%.
 Avtotechnoproekt LLC — 24%.

Description 
JV "Electrontrans" - a full-scale enterprise specializing in the design and manufacture of modern urban electric vehicles - trams, trolleybuses, electric buses, units and spare parts. The company is a modern machine-building plant with technologically flexible production, which today manufactures tram cars for tracks of different widths - 1000 mm, 1435 mm and 1524 mm - i.e. not only for Ukrainian cities but also for export - to the CIS and the European Union.

The company includes design and technological bureaus, machining, welding, painting and assembly production.

The production capacity of JV "Electrontrans" allows to produce 100 trams or 100 trolleybuses or electric buses per year.

Within the framework of the machine-building corporation "Electron" a large-scale program of localization (import substitution) of production of units and aggregates for electric transport is being implemented. JV "Electrontrans" carries out the gradual development of the production of tram carts, control systems for traction equipment of trams, trolleybuses and electric buses, couplings for trams and double-link trolleybuses and buses, front independent suspensions, other components and units.

Areas of activity

Main areas 
The enterprise carries out work on release of 3 directions of transport mechanical engineering.

 Trams
 Trolleybuses
 Electric buses
 Buses
 Electrocars

Model line of JV "Electrontrans" in terms of years of production

Profile services 
In addition to the main activities, the company "Electrontrans" provides a range of services for machining metals and manufacturing parts and products on CNC lathes, milling, drilling groups (both according to customer drawings and samples), as well as specialized services:

 Laser cutting of metals
 Pipe bending production
 Bending of metal
 Dyeing

See also 
 Lviv Bus Factory
 Car classification

Notes

Sources 
 Про підприємство
 http://uprom.info/news/cars/elektron-zavershiv-vigotovlennya-tramvayiv-po-zamovlennyu-dlya-kiyeva/

2011 establishments in Ukraine
Companies based in Lviv
Commons category link is on Wikidata
Companies established in 2011